The 2016–17 season was Charlton Athletic's 95th season in their existence and first back in League One – since being champions in 2011–12 – following relegation from the championship the previous season. Along with competing in the League One, the club also participated in the FA Cup, League Cup and League Trophy. The season covered the period from 1 July 2016 to 30 June 2017.

Squad statistics

|}

Top scorers

Disciplinary record

Transfers

In

Out

Loans in

Loans out

Competitions

Pre-season friendlies

League One

League table

Results summary

Results by round

Matches

FA Cup

League Cup

EFL Trophy

Kent Senior Cup

References

Notes

Charlton Athletic
Charlton Athletic F.C. seasons